Open individualism is the view in the philosophy of self, according to which there exists only one numerically identical subject, who is everyone at all times, in the past, present and future. It is a theoretical solution to the question of personal identity, being contrasted with "Empty individualism", the view that personal identities correspond to a fixed pattern that instantaneously disappears with the passage of time, and with "Closed individualism", the common view that personal identities are particular to subjects and yet survive over time.

History 
The term was coined by philosopher Daniel Kolak, though this view has been described at least since the time of the Upanishads, in the late Bronze Age; the phrase "Tat tvam asi" meaning "You are that" is an example. Others who have expressed similar views (in various forms) include the philosophers Averroes, Arthur Schopenhauer, and Arnold Zuboff, mystic Meher Baba, stand-up comedian Bill Hicks, writer Alan Watts, as well as renowned physicists Erwin Schrödinger, Freeman Dyson, and Fred Hoyle.

In fiction 
Leo Tolstoy in the short story "Esarhaddon, King of Assyria", tells how an old man appears before Esarhaddon and takes the king through a process where he experiences, from a first-person perspective, the lives of humans and non-human animals he has tormented. This reveals to him that he is everyone and that by harming others, he is actually harming himself.

In the science fiction novel October the First Is Too Late, Fred Hoyle puts forward the "pigeon hole theory" which asserts that "each moment of time can be thought of as a pre-existing pigeon hole" and the pigeon hole currently being examined by your consciousness is the present and that the spotlight of consciousness does not have to move in a linear fashion; it could potentially move around in any order. Hoyle considers the possibility that there might be one set of pigeon holes for each person, but only one spotlight, which would mean that the "consciousness could be the same".

"The Egg", a short story by Andy Weir, is about a character who finds out that they are every person who has ever existed.

See also

 Anattā
 Eternalism
 God becomes the Universe
 Hermeticism
 Indefinite monism
 Metempsychosis
 Mindmelding
 Monopsychism
 Nondualism
 Objective idealism
 Organicism
 Panpsychism
 Vertiginous question

References

Further reading

Articles

Books

External links 
 

Identity (philosophy)
Metaphysical theories
Metaphysics of mind
Conceptions of self
Theory of mind